Rukmini Chaudhari is a Nepalese politician. She was elected to the Second Constituent Assembly in the 2013 election as a Proportional Representation candidate of the Sanghiya Loktantrik Rastriya Manch (Tharuhat).

References

Living people
Year of birth missing (living people)
Place of birth missing (living people)
Members of the 1st Nepalese Constituent Assembly
Members of the 2nd Nepalese Constituent Assembly